Georg Mancelius (born 24 June / 4 July 1593 in Grenzhof (now Mežmuiža in Augstkalne Parish), Courland; died 17 March 1654 in Mitau) was a Baltic German Lutheran theologian in what is now Latvia. He wrote the first dictionary of the Latvian language. From 1635 to 1636 he was Vice Rector of the University of Tartu and from 1636 Rector.

Selected works 
 1619 - De terrae motu (earthquake of 30 June 1616 in Zemgale)
 1631/1643 - Vademecum (guide to spiritual texts in Latvian)
 1638 - Lettus, das ist Wortbuch sampt angehengtem täglichem Gebrauch der Lettischen Sprache. Riga, 1638 (long title: Lettus, Das ist Wortbuch, Sampt angehengtem täglichem Gebrauch der Lettischen Sprache; Allen vnd jeden Außheimischen, die in Churland, Semgallen vnd Lettischem Liefflande bleiben, vnd sich redlich nehren wollen, zu Nutze verfertigt durch GEORGIVM MANCELIVM Anno M. DC. XXXVIII)
 1654 - Langgewünschte Lettische Postill (Latvian Sermon Book), reissued in 1699, 1746, 1769, 1823

References

Further reading
 Kristi Viiding: Das Porträt eines liv- und kurländischen orthodoxen Theologen (Georg Mancelius), anhand der ihm gewidmeten Geleit und Begrüßungsgedichte. In: Udo Sträter (ed.): Orthodoxie und Poesie. Evangelische Verlagsanstalt Leipzig 2004 
 Johann Friedrich von Recke, Karl Eduard Napiersky: Mancelius (Georg). In: Allgemeines Schriftsteller- und Gelehrten-Lexikon der Provinzen Livland, Esthland und Kurland. 1831, pp. 152–156 Google Books
 Carola L. Gottzmann / Petra Hörner: Lexikon der deutschsprachigen Literatur des Baltikums und St. Petersburgs. Verlag Walter de Gruyter, Berlin 2007. Bd.2, pp. 883–885. 

1593 births
1654 deaths
People from Tērvete Municipality
People from the Duchy of Courland and Semigallia
Baltic-German people
Latvian theologians
Grammarians from Germany
Rectors of the University of Tartu